Poseidon (19 August 1903 - 3 February 1930) was an Australian Thoroughbred Hall of Fame racehorse. He won 19 races over distances ranging from five furlongs to three miles. Sixteen of these wins were "Principal Races" (equivalent to today's "Black Type" races), eight of them now of Group 1 (G1) status.

As a three-year-old in 1906/07, Poseidon had 14 starts for 11 wins, including the Caulfield Cup (in race record time), Melbourne Cup, Victoria Derby and AJC Derby. In achieving this, Poseidon became the first horse to complete the Caulfield Cup-Melbourne Cup double. In winning the Caulfield Cup again the following year, he also became the first horse to win consecutive Caulfield Cups.

Early history
Poseidon was foaled on 19 August 1903 at R H Dangar's Neotsfield Stud in NSW. He was from the fifth crop of his sire Positano (GB) and was the fifth foal of his dam Jacinth, a daughter of Martini-Henry (NZ), winner of 1883 VRC Melbourne Cup. Positano, a son of the great St. Simon, was unplaced in his seven starts in England, although he was placed second in the Ascot Derby. After he was imported into Australia he won three races from 12 starts. Jacinth won five races and was the dam of 11 foals, seven of whom raced for five moderate winners, aside from Poseidon.

At the dispersal of the Neotsfield Stud, Poseidon was sold to the Moses brothers as a foal at foot with his dam for 400 guineas. The Moses brothers went on to establish the Arrowfield Stud near Singleton, NSW. Interested only in the dam and not the foal at foot, Poseidon was later sold to owner, Sir Hugh Denison for 500 guineas at the April 1905 Chisholm and Co Yearling Sales in Sydney.

Racing career
Poseidon was trained by Isaac Earnshaw, and ridden throughout his career by Tom Clayton,

Season 1905/06 - two-year-old
Six starts: 1-0-1

Unplaced in his racing debut, Poseidon won at his second start as favourite by 4 lengths. Then sent to Melbourne, he had two starts but did not figure in the placings. Sent back to Sydney, Poseidon was off the board in the AJC Champagne Stakes. In his last two-year-old start he finished in a dead heat for third in the AJC Nursery Handicap, and was then sent out for a spell.

Season 1906/07 - three-year-old
14 starts: 11-3-0

Poseidon had an exemplary career as a three-year-old.

He began his three-year-old season with wins in two minor races, before winning the AJC Derby by three lengths, ahead of the two favourites. Just two days later, he raced against older competition for the first time in the AJC Metropolitan Handicap, finishing in second place to Solution (NZ).

Poseidon chalked up a string of wins in Melbourne. First came the VATC Eclipse Stakes in record time, then just two days later the Caulfield Cup in race record time, the VRC Victoria Derby, and finally the VRC Melbourne Cup.

After a spell over Christmas, Poseidon returned in the autumn and continued on his winning ways with wins in the VATC St Helier Stakes, VRC St Leger Stakes, and the VRC Loch Plate. He then finished second to Dividend in the three mile VRC Champion Stakes, before heading back to Sydney for the Autumn Racing Carnival.

In his two starts in the autumn, Poseidon won the AJC St Leger, but in his last start as a three-year-old, he finished second again to Dividend in the AJC Cumberland Stakes.

During his three-year-old season, Poseidon won approximately £12,000 in prize money.

Season 1907/08 - four-year-old
Twelve starts: 7-1-2

Poseidon continued on his winning way as a four-year-old.

At his first start back in the Rawson Stakes he finished third, but won at his next start, in the WFA AJC Spring Stakes (12-fur) at Randwick ahead of stable mate Apologue. At his second start Poseidon disappointed his backers with a poor third in the AJC Craven Plate, after Antonius had cannoned into him mid-race and knocked the wind out of him.

Moving back down to Melbourne for the Spring Carnival, Poseidon returned to form, winning the WFA VATC Eclipse Stakes at Caulfield on 16 October 1907, the Wednesday before the Caulfield Cup.

There were 16 starters in the Caulfield Cup in 1907, and after the start he was dropped towards the rear of the field. Jockey Tom Clayton waited to the half mile then set off on Poseidon. Poseidon raced around the field and dashed clear with a winning break, the Cup in his keeping. He had become the first horse to win consecutive Caulfield Cups.

On Derby Day, as 1-3 favourite, Poseidon won again beating Apologue in the VRC Melbourne Stakes.

Next was the Melbourne Cup, but as a result of his Caulfield Cup win, Poseidon was given a 10 lb penalty, and had to carry . The weight told, and Poseidon finished in eighth place with the win going to Apologue who carried only .

Poseidon's return to the track in 1908 was delayed by a minor leg problem. He bypassed the Melbourne Autumn Carnival but in a shortened Sydney program, won three of his four starts. His only failure was a fourth place to Tartan in the AJC Autumn Stakes.

Season 1908/09 - five-year-old
One unplaced start.

Poseidon returned as a five-year-old for one last campaign. After finishing fifth in the RRC Rawson Stakes, he pulled up sore. As he would require a long spell away from the track to recover, the decision was made to retire Poseidon to stud duties.

Race record

Stud record
Poseidon's owner had established the 'Eurmeralla Stud' at Gulgong, NSW, with a number of well-bred Australian and British mares to give Poseidon every chance of success as a sire.

His best performers were the "Principal Race" winners:
 Rascasse
1915 QTC Queensland Derby
 Telecles
 1918 WmtnRC Australia Day Cup
 1919 MVRC Moonee Valley Cup

Poseidon died on 3 February 1930 at 26 years of age. Each year the Listed VRC Poseidon Stakes for three-year-old colts and geldings is run in his honour.

Pedigree

See also
List of leading Thoroughbred racehorses

References

Thoroughbred Heritage: Family 10 - Fair Helen/Childers Mare
Bloodlines.net: Family 10 - Fair Helen
Bloodlines.net: Family 10d - Braxey

Sources

1903 racehorse births
1930 racehorse deaths
Racehorses bred in Australia
Racehorses trained in Australia
Melbourne Cup winners
Victoria Derby winners
Australian Racing Hall of Fame horses
Caulfield Cup winners
Thoroughbred family 10-d